Pequeña revancha is a 1986 Venezuelan film directed by Olegario Barrera Monteverde, with his screenplay based on the story La composición by Chilean writer Antonio Skármeta.

Plot 
Pedro is a 12-year-old boy who lives in a village where any question is answered with repression. He has a girlfriend, Matilde, and a dog, Rocky. The teacher and father of a friend are arrested by the military. The death of his dog makes him look for revenge.

Reception 
The film was nominated for the 1st Goya Awards as Best Iberoamerican Film. It also received the TVE Special Award for New Directors at the 1985 San Sebastián International Film Festival and the Critics' and Jury Awards at the Havana Film Festival.

References

Bibliography 
 Literatura y cine en Venezuela, Diana Medina Meléndez

External links 
 Trailer in YouTube

1986 films
Venezuelan drama films
1980s Spanish-language films